Mamangam (English: Foul Play)  is an Indian Malayalam television series which launched on Flowers on 18 September 2017 and aired till 26 April 2018. The show was one of biggest failures in television industry due to its uninteresting plot.

Aishwarya Nair, Sajan Surya, Sarath Das, Amrutha, Beena Antony, Rekha Ratheesh, Boban Alummoodan & Meghna Vincent are main protagonists of the show.

Cast 
 Aishwarya Nair as Archa
 Sajan Surya as Adv. Vishnu
 Sarath Das as Appu/Devakumar IPS
 Amrutha Varnan as Mridula
 GK Pillai as Mahadevan Thampi
 Souparnika Subash as Abhirami
 Beena Antony as Kanimangalath Kanakadurga
 Rekha Ratheesh as Manimangalath Neelambari
 Mahesh as Chandran
 Boban Alummoodan as Adv.Madhavan
 Archana Suseelan as Arundathi
 Adithyan Jayan
 Yathikumar as Balan
 Meghna Vincent as Karthika
 Gowri Krishna as Menaka
 Angel Mariya Joseph as Anasooya
 Navya as Sukanya
 Alis Christy as Meera
 Krishna Prasad as Dr.Hari
 Subar as Abu
 Akhil as Aromal Madhavan
 Devi Chandana as Sathyavathi
 Kottayam Rasheed as Uthaman
 Senthil Kumar
 Leena Nair as Aswathy
 Jeeja Surendran as Jackie Chan
 Shruthy
 Sreekutty
 Jismy
 Kailasnath
 M. R. Gopakumar
 Poojappura Radhakrishnan
 KPAC Leelamani
 Sojan
 Lakshmi Sanal

Airing History

References 

2017 Indian television series debuts
Malayalam-language television shows
Flowers (TV channel) original programming